Ikot Akpa Esa is a village in Etinan, a local government area of the Akwa Ibom state.

References 

Villages in Akwa Ibom